Events in the year 1980 in Bulgaria.

Incumbents 

 General Secretaries of the Bulgarian Communist Party: Todor Zhivkov
 Chairmen of the Council of Ministers: Stanko Todorov

Events 

 Konstantin Pavlov's screenplay for the film Illusion won the Grand Prix at the Karlovy Vary Film Festival.

References 

 
1980s in Bulgaria
Years of the 20th century in Bulgaria
Bulgaria
Bulgaria